This is a list of National Football League running backs by total career rushing attempts. This list includes all running backs with at least 2,500 attempts.

Active players listed in bold type.

Players with at least 2,500 rushing attempts

Active player with at least 2,000 attempts
Thru  season; numbers in attempts.

Notes

See also
List of NFL rushing champions
List of National Football League rushing yards leaders
List of National Football League rushing touchdowns leaders

External links
Pro-football-reference.com enumeration of career rushing attempts leaders

Rushing touchdowns leaders
National Football League lists